Njarðvík FC, commonly known as Njarðvík or UMFN, is the men's football department of Ungmennafélag Njarðvíkur multi-sport club, based in the town of Reykjanesbær in Iceland. It currently plays in the Icelandic football league system second-tier 1. deild karla.

Honours
2. deild karla (Men's Second Division ): (3)
 1981
 2017
 2022
'League Cup B (cup): (2)
 2003
 2012 (Runner up)
 2017 (Runner up)
 2022

Current squad

References

Football clubs in Iceland
Ungmennafélag Njarðvíkur